"Wonderboy" is the debut single by American rock-comedy duo Tenacious D. It was released in September 2001 on the same day as their self-titled debut album. The song peaked at number 36 in the UK and number 44 in Australia; the video, directed by Spike Jonze, was also well received. The song is also the entrance theme for UFC fighter Stephen Thompson whose nickname is "Wonderboy".

Structure
Strings were played by Andrew Gross, a classmate of Jack Black, who penned the orchestral score for Tenacious D in The Pick of Destiny. He also played strings on several songs on this album.

Jack Black's friend Buckethead, covered the song occasionally when playing live.

Music video 

The lyrics of the song tell the tale of the superhero Wonderboy (Black) as he forms an alliance with his lute-wielding arch-rival Young Nasty Man (KG) and forms the band Tenacious D. Wonderboy's powers are not revealed in the song but according to the lyrics we know that Young Nasty Man has powers that are "comparable" to Wonderboy's.  Young Nasty Man has a variety of seemingly telekinetic powers, such as flight via levitation, "mind bullets" via telekinesis (with an apparent range of at least 200 yards and enough force to "kill a yak"), and "the power to move you". The song also mentions Wonderboy's castle made of clouds, the use of swords, and an attempt to destroy a hydra (The Mucky Muck Man), which is not seen in the video, but is mentioned in the song.

In the video, Wonderboy and Young Nasty Man are portrayed as Medieval/Mythological skill-and-strength heroes, climbing a snowy mountain. At the end of the video they fight a monster (which is off-screen but its flaming breath can be seen) and Wonderboy perishes, having been run through by his own sword. The fates of Young Nasty Man and the monster (presumably the fire-breathing hydra mentioned in the lyrics) remain unknown.

The video was directed by Spike Jonze under the alias of Marcus Von Bueler. The producer was Vincent Landay and K.K. Barrett was the stunt director. The production company was Satellite Films. The music video was first aired during the week beginning October 29, 2001.

In 2002, Spike Jonze won an award from the MVPA (Music Video Production Association) for the "Best Direction of a New Artist" for his work on "Wonderboy".

Track listings
US CD single (Epic Records #673351 5)
 "Wonderboy" – 4:07
 "Cosmic Shame" (live) – 4:28 ''Recorded at the Cox Arena in San Diego on November 20, 2001.
 "Kyle Quit the Band" (demo) – 2:10
 "Wonderboy– (video) – 4:07

Australia and New Zealand CD single (Epic Records #673286.2)
 "Wonderboy" – 4:07
 "Tribute" (Channel V Performance) – 4.34
 "Tribute" (video) – 4:08

UK CD single (Epic Records #673351 2)
 "Wonderboy" – 4:07
 "Jesus Ranch" (demo) – 2:14
 "Tribute" (video) – 4:08

Promotional CD (Epic Records #XPCD2756)
 "Wonderboy" – 4:07

Personnel 
 Jack Black – vocals, acoustic guitar
 Kyle Gass – backing vocals, acoustic guitar
 Page McConnell – keys
 Dave Grohl – drums/guitar
 Alfredo Ortiz – additional drums
 Andrew Gross – strings
 Dust Brothers – production
 Ken Andrews – mixer

Charts

References

2001 songs
2001 debut singles
Tenacious D songs
Music videos directed by Spike Jonze
Song recordings produced by Dust Brothers